Kristine Carlson (born July 5, 1963, Portland, Oregon) is an American author living in California. A graduate of Pepperdine University, she is known as co-author with her husband, the late Dr. Richard Carlson of the Don’t Sweat the Small Stuff…and it’s all Small Stuff series, and author of Don’t Sweat the Small Stuff in Love and Don’t Sweat the Small Stuff for Women. She served on the Board of Directors and the Global Leadership Council for Challenge Day.

Her best-selling book, written with her late husband and released in December 1997, is An Hour to Live, an Hour to Love, and is based on an extended love letter written to her by her husband. Richard Carlson died from a pulmonary embolism at 45.

In addition to appearances on The Oprah Winfrey Show on December 5, 2007, Carlson has appeared on other national talk shows, such as The Today Show and The View and local news and talk shows, such as CBS in San Francisco.

Kristine Carlson wrote three bestsellers, An Hour to Live, An Hour to Love: The True Story of the Best Gift Ever Given; Don't Sweat the Small Stuff in Love; and Don’t Sweat the Small Stuff for Women.

Heart Broken Open is a memoir of her grief and mourning the sudden loss of her husband.

In 2010 Carlson was honored with the Kennedy Laureate Award by John F. Kennedy University.

References

External links 
 Don't Sweat.com official site
 Love in a Time of Loss - Diablo Magazine
 

American women writers
1963 births
Living people
Pepperdine University alumni
Writers from Portland, Oregon
21st-century American women